Liludi Dharati is a 1968 Gujarati social drama film directed by Vallabh Choksi. It stars Daizy Irani, Mahesh Desai, Kala Shah, Champshibhai Nagda, Upendra Kumar, Kishore Bhatt, Narahari Jani, Vina Prabhu, Vanalata Mehta. The film was adapted from Gujarati writer Chunilal Madia's novel of the same name. It was the first ORWO colour film of Gujarati cinema.

Plot
The film follows a love story of Gobar and Santu, and is set in a rural background. It depicts the struggle of negative influence among characters and their corrupted desires. Antagonists such as Mandal and Shardul inject doubt in the lives of the couple. An unexpected twist comes in the form of the death of Gobar, which leads to Santu's loss of mental balance. After the death of Gobar, the family encounters financial stress. As a result, Santu and her sister-in-law turn to farming. Gobar's brother returns and joins the ploughing.

Cast
 Daizy Irani
 Mahesh Desai, Kala Shah
 Champshibhai Nagda
 Upendra Kumar
 Kishore Bhatt
 Narahari Jani
 Vina Prabhu
 Vanalata Mehta

Production
The film was adapted from Gujarati writer Chunilal Madia's novel of the same name. The screenplay was written by Manu Desai and dialogues were written by Jitubhai Mehta.

Soundtrack

Home video
The film was released on DVD by Moser Baer.

References

External links
 

Films set in Gujarat
Films shot in Gujarat
Indian drama films
1960s Gujarati-language films